Saratoga Springs High School is a public high school in Saratoga Springs, New York. The school was originally located on Lake Avenue, but was relocated to its current location prior to 1969. The current campus was renovated in 2002. The school's drama club is a regular contender for the Schenectady Light Opera's High School Musical Award, placing 2nd in 2011 and winning first place in 2008. The girls' cross country team was ranked first in the nation for eight years, and when winning the inaugural Nike Cross Nationals in 2004 was labeled as the greatest high school girls' team in history. Their boys' cross country team won the National Championship in 2005. Also known for its other successful athletic teams, such as ice hockey (New York State champion, 1999 and 2013; New York State finalist, 2010–11), boys' and girls' lacrosse, boys' and girls' indoor and outdoor track and field, football, baseball, competitive cheerleading, girls' tennis, golf and skiing.  In 2009-10, Saratoga Springs finished second among the state's Class A schools in the New York State Sportswriters Association All-Sport Championship.

Notable alumni

 David Hyde Pierce (1977), actor
 Stacey Fox (1983), musician, filmmaker, animator
 Don Pepper (1961), professional baseball player
 Matt Rhoades (1993), Republican political operative, manager of Mitt Romney's 2012 presidential campaign
 Matt Riddle (2004), former mixed martial artist and professional wrestler
 Scott Valentine (1976), actor
 Anthony Weaver (1998), former NFL defensive end, current defensive line coach and run game coordinator of the Baltimore Ravens.

References

Public high schools in New York (state)
Buildings and structures in Saratoga Springs, New York
Schools in Saratoga County, New York